Wind is a topographical surname, of English origin, for someone who lived near a pathway, alleyway, or road. It is most popular in North East England, especially in Newcastle upon Tyne and Sunderland. However, the surname is also popular in the Netherlands and Denmark. The surname has several spelling forms including Waind, Wind, Wynd, Wain and Wean.

Origins
Wind originates from the Pre 7th century Old English "gewind". It describes either a person who lived by a particularly windy area such as North East England or a "winding" road. In the medieval times Wind was possibly given to a speedy runner or messenger.

The surname Wind was first found in Lancashire, a ceremonial county in North West England, at Windle with Hardshaw, a township, in the parish and union of Prescot, hundred of West Derby. "Before the reign of John, Windhull gave name to a family, of whom was Edusa, widow of Alan de Windhull, who obtained from that king a summons for her dower against Alan de Windhull, son of the former."

Incidence, frequency and rank in area
According to Forebears.io, the highest incidence of the Wind surname can be found in the United States, followed by Germany, the Netherlands, and Denmark.

Notable people with the surname
 Alex Wind (born 2001), American student activist
 Bartina Harmina Wind (1891–1974), Dutch scientist
 Cornelis Wind (1867–1911), Dutch physicist
 Diana Wind (born 1957), Dutch art historian
 Dorothy Wind, American baseball player
 Edgar Wind (1900–1971), British historian
 Edmund De Wind (1883–1918), Canadian/Irish war hero
 Franz Ludwig Wind (1719–1989), Swiss sculptor
 Gerhard Wind (1928–1992), German painter
 Hans Wind (1919–1995), Finnish World War II flying ace
 Hans Christian Wind (born 1932), Danish teologist
 Harmen Wind (1945–2010), Dutch poet
 Henning Wind (born 1937), Danish competitive sailor
 Herbert Warren Wind (1916–2005), American writer
 Horst-Helmut Wind (1927–2009) German sailor
 Joachim Frederik Wind (1637–1687), Norwegian  sailor
 John Wind (1819–1863), English architect
 Jonas Wind (born 1999), Danish footballer
 Kim Wind (born 1957), Danish rower
 Marlene Wind (born 1963), Danish political scientist
 Martin Wind (born 1968), German jazz musician
 Patrick Wind (born 1968), German composer
 Per Wind (born 1955), Danish footballer
 Per Wind (born 1947), Danish rower
 Pierre Wind (born 1965), Dutch chef
 Stefanie Wind, American linguist
 Susie Wind (born 1968), American visual artist
 Tommy Wind, American illusionist
 Willie Wind (1913–1995), American artist

References

External links
 National Trust, 2007. "What do the statistics in the geographical location and social demographic tables mean?"
 United States Census Bureau (9 May 1995). s:1990 Census Name Files dist.all.last (1-100). Retrieved on 25 February 2008.

English-language surnames
Surnames of English origin
Dutch-language surnames
Patronymic surnames